is a Japanese goalball player with a congenital visual impairment. She was part of the bronze medal-winning Japanese women's team at the 2004 Summer Paralympics. At the 2012 Summer Paralympics she captained the gold medal-winning Japanese women's team. After the game she stated "The day [we waited for] finally came. I was so overcome with emotion that I couldn't finish singing the 'Kimigayo' national anthem."

Her impairment was caused by retinitis pigmentosa, which destroyed her vision in both eyes when she was in primary school. She began playing in 2001. Her coach,  Naoki Eguro, introduced her to the sport.

References 

Paralympic gold medalists for Japan
Paralympic bronze medalists for Japan
Goalball players at the 2004 Summer Paralympics
Goalball players at the 2008 Summer Paralympics
Goalball players at the 2012 Summer Paralympics
Goalball players at the 2016 Summer Paralympics
Sportspeople from Fukuoka (city)
1975 births
Living people
Medalists at the 2004 Summer Paralympics
Medalists at the 2012 Summer Paralympics
Paralympic goalball players of Japan
Female goalball players
Kyushu Sangyo University alumni
Paralympic medalists in goalball